Market East is the newest of seven designated cultural districts in Indianapolis, Indiana. The district is on the east side of downtown (in the area where Market Square Arena once stood) and is bounded to the north by New York Street, to the south by the railroad tracks, to the west by Delaware Street and to the east by East Street.

History
Indianapolis City Market has been serving local residents and businesses since 1886 and was listed on the National Register of Historic Places in 1974. From 1886 to 1958 the area was also home to Tomlinson Hall, a civic center which was located at the northeast corner Delaware and Market streets. After a devastating fire all that remains are the so called ‘Catacombs’, the subterranean foundation of the hall.

The old Indianapolis City Hall sits at the south corner of Alabama and Ohio. Built in 1910, it served as city hall until 1962 when the new City-County Building was erected near by. From 1962 to 2002 the building housed the Indiana State Museum and then served as the city's main library during construction on an addition to the Indianapolis Central Library. The building has been vacant since 2008. It was listed on the National Register of Historic Places in 1974.

From 1974 through 2001, Market Square Arena occupied a one-block area spanning Market Street. It was demolished to make way for new development that is now Cummins Distribution Headquarters and the 360 Market Square apartments.

Today
The Indianapolis City Market and Indianapolis Cultural Trail are located in the area. Since its designation in 2014, the area has added several new high-profile government, residential, and commercial entities including: 

Julia M. Carson Transit Center (2016)
Cummins Distribution Headquarters and greenspace (2017)
St. Vincent Center (2017)
360 Market Square (2018)
Richard G. Lugar Plaza at the City-County Building (2018)

Future
With a new criminal justice center being built on the southeast side of town, by 2021 the current jail, courts, and sheriff's office will move from their current locations in the Indianapolis City-County Building to their new home. Mayor Joe Hogsett’s Indy 3.0 plan is to reevaluate where and how government offices operate. Ideas include selling public buildings such as the City-County Building and moving the government seat back to the old City Hall at 202 N. Alabama Street.

References

Neighborhoods in Indianapolis
Culture of Indianapolis